Coleophora paradoxella is a moth of the family Coleophoridae. It is found in southern Russia and China.

References

paradoxella
Moths of Europe
Moths of Asia
Moths described in 1961